The 1912 United States House of Representatives elections were elections for the United States House of Representatives to elect members to serve in the 63rd United States Congress. They were held for the most part on November 5, 1912, while Maine and Vermont held theirs in September. They coincided with the election of President Woodrow Wilson.

Wilson's victory was partly due to the division of the opposition Republican Party into conservative and progressive factions. While many progressives stayed within the party framework, they maintained lukewarm relationships with Republican leadership. Others formed a third party known as the Progressives and several switched allegiance to the Democrats. A message of unity was portrayed by the Democrats, allowing this group to present themselves as above the bickering and corruption that had become associated with the Republican internal feud. Many of the new seats that were added after the prior census ended up in Democratic hands. In addition, William Kent, who had been elected to the House as a Republican in 1908, was elected to California's 1st congressional district as an Independent.

This was the first election after the congressional reapportionment based on the 1910 Census. The Apportionment Act of 1911 also guaranteed that Arizona and New Mexico would have one seat each after those states joined the union in early 1912. Under this reapportionment, the number of representatives was increased to 435, where it currently stands (the 435-seat cap was later made permanent after the passage of the Reapportionment Act of 1929, with the exception of 1959 when Alaska and Hawaii were admitted as states).

Election summaries 
In reapportionment following the 1910 census, 41 new seats were added, bringing the House to its modern size. This would be the last time the size of the House changed, except for a temporary addition of two seats in 1959 after the admission of Alaska and Hawaii and subsequent return to 435 in 1963. In the reapportionment, 1 state lost 1 seat, 22 states had no change in apportionment, 16 states gained 1 seat each, 5 states gained 2 seats each, 2 states gained 3 seats, 1 state gained 4 seats, and 1 state gained 6 seats. Twelve states used at-large seats in addition to districts to elect new seats.

|-
|align=center colspan=15|
|-

|- style="text-align:center; background-color:#F2F2F2;"
! style="border: 1px solid #aaa" colspan=2 rowspan=2 | Political party
! style="border: 1px solid #aaa" rowspan=2 | Leader
! style="border: 1px solid #aaa" colspan=6           | MOCs
! style="border: 1px solid #aaa" colspan=3           | Votes
|- style="text-align:center; background-color:#F2F2F2;"
! style="border: 1px solid #aaa" | Contested
! style="border: 1px solid #aaa" | Total
! style="border: 1px solid #aaa" | Gained
! style="border: 1px solid #aaa" | Lost
! style="border: 1px solid #aaa" | Net
! style="border: 1px solid #aaa" | Of total (%)
! style="border: 1px solid #aaa" | Total
! style="border: 1px solid #aaa" | Of total (%)
! style="border: 1px solid #aaa" | Change (%)
|-
| data-sort-value="Democratic Party (US)" 
| style="border: 1px solid #aaa; text-align: left" scope="row" | 
| style="border: 1px solid #aaa; text-align: left" | Champ Clark
| style="border: 1px solid #aaa" | 431
| style="border: 1px solid #aaa" | 291
| style="border: 1px solid #aaa" | 71
| style="border: 1px solid #aaa" | 10
| style="border: 1px solid #aaa" |  61
| style="border: 1px solid #aaa" | 66.90%
| style="border: 1px solid #aaa" | 8,210,137
| style="border: 1px solid #aaa" | 43.29%
| style="border: 1px solid #aaa" | -
|-
| style="border: 1px solid #aaa" data-sort-value="Republican Party (US)" 
| style="border: 1px solid #aaa; text-align: left" scope="row" | 
| style="border: 1px solid #aaa; text-align: left" | James Mann
| style="border: 1px solid #aaa" | 370
| style="border: 1px solid #aaa" | 134
| style="border: 1px solid #aaa" | 17
| style="border: 1px solid #aaa" | 46
| style="border: 1px solid #aaa" |  29
| style="border: 1px solid #aaa" | 30.80%
| style="border: 1px solid #aaa" | 7,377,514
| style="border: 1px solid #aaa" | 38.90%
| style="border: 1px solid #aaa" | -
|-
| data-sort-value="Progressive" 
| style="border: 1px solid #aaa; text-align: left" scope="row" | 
| style="border: 1px solid #aaa; text-align: left" |
| style="border: 1px solid #aaa" | 208
| style="border: 1px solid #aaa" | 8
| style="border: 1px solid #aaa" | 0
| style="border: 1px solid #aaa" | 8
| style="border: 1px solid #aaa" |  8
| style="border: 1px solid #aaa" | 1.84%
| style="border: 1px solid #aaa" | 1,761,545
| style="border: 1px solid #aaa" | 9.29%
| style="border: 1px solid #aaa" | -
|-
| data-sort-value="Socialist" 
| style="border: 1px solid #aaa; text-align: left" scope="row" | Socialist
| style="border: 1px solid #aaa; text-align: left" |
| style="border: 1px solid #aaa" | 335
| style="border: 1px solid #aaa" | 0
| style="border: 1px solid #aaa" | 1
| style="border: 1px solid #aaa" | 0
| style="border: 1px solid #aaa" |  1
| style="border: 1px solid #aaa" | 0%
| style="border: 1px solid #aaa" | 1,505,576
| style="border: 1px solid #aaa" | 7.94%
| style="border: 1px solid #aaa" | -
|-
| data-sort-value="Prohibition" 
| style="border: 1px solid #aaa; text-align: left" scope="row" | 
| style="border: 1px solid #aaa; text-align: left" |
| style="border: 1px solid #aaa" | 209
| style="border: 1px solid #aaa" | 0
| style="border: 1px solid #aaa" | 0
| style="border: 1px solid #aaa" | 0
| style="border: 1px solid #aaa" | 
| style="border: 1px solid #aaa" | 0%
| style="border: 1px solid #aaa" | 279,036
| style="border: 1px solid #aaa" | 1.47%
| style="border: 1px solid #aaa" | -
|-
| data-sort-value="Washington" 
| style="border: 1px solid #aaa; text-align: left" scope="row" | Washington
| style="border: 1px solid #aaa; text-align: left" |
| style="border: 1px solid #aaa" | 13
| style="border: 1px solid #aaa" | 2
| style="border: 1px solid #aaa" | 0
| style="border: 1px solid #aaa" | 2
| style="border: 1px solid #aaa" |  2
| style="border: 1px solid #aaa" | 0.46%
| style="border: 1px solid #aaa" | 130,073
| style="border: 1px solid #aaa" | 0.69%
| style="border: 1px solid #aaa" | -
|-
| data-sort-value="Keystone" 
| style="border: 1px solid #aaa; text-align: left" scope="row" | Keystone
| style="border: 1px solid #aaa; text-align: left" |
| style="border: 1px solid #aaa" | 8
| style="border: 1px solid #aaa" | 0
| style="border: 1px solid #aaa" | 0
| style="border: 1px solid #aaa" | 0
| style="border: 1px solid #aaa" | 
| style="border: 1px solid #aaa" | 0%
| style="border: 1px solid #aaa" | 85,278
| style="border: 1px solid #aaa" | 0.45%
| style="border: 1px solid #aaa" | -
|-
| data-sort-value="Progressive Republican" 
| style="border: 1px solid #aaa; text-align: left" scope="row" | Progressive Republican
| style="border: 1px solid #aaa; text-align: left" |
| style="border: 1px solid #aaa" | 2
| style="border: 1px solid #aaa" | 0
| style="border: 1px solid #aaa" | 0
| style="border: 1px solid #aaa" | 0
| style="border: 1px solid #aaa" | 
| style="border: 1px solid #aaa" | 0%
| style="border: 1px solid #aaa" | 23,078
| style="border: 1px solid #aaa" | 0.12%
| style="border: 1px solid #aaa" | -
|-
| data-sort-value="" 
| style="border: 1px solid #aaa; text-align: left" | 
| style="border: 1px solid #aaa; text-align: left" | 
| style="border: 1px solid #aaa" | 25
| style="border: 1px solid #aaa" | 0
| style="border: 1px solid #aaa" | 0
| style="border: 1px solid #aaa" | 0
| style="border: 1px solid #aaa" | 
| style="border: 1px solid #aaa" | 0%
| style="border: 1px solid #aaa" | 12,670
| style="border: 1px solid #aaa" | 0.07%
| style="border: 1px solid #aaa" | -
|-
| data-sort-value="Bull Moose" 
| style="border: 1px solid #aaa; text-align: left" scope="row" | Bull Moose
| style="border: 1px solid #aaa; text-align: left" |
| style="border: 1px solid #aaa" | 2
| style="border: 1px solid #aaa" | 0
| style="border: 1px solid #aaa" | 0
| style="border: 1px solid #aaa" | 0
| style="border: 1px solid #aaa" | 
| style="border: 1px solid #aaa" | 0%
| style="border: 1px solid #aaa" | 10,460
| style="border: 1px solid #aaa" | 0.06%
| style="border: 1px solid #aaa" | -
|-
| data-sort-value="Socialist Labor" 
| style="border: 1px solid #aaa; text-align: left" scope="row" | 
| style="border: 1px solid #aaa; text-align: left" |
| style="border: 1px solid #aaa" | 21
| style="border: 1px solid #aaa" | 0
| style="border: 1px solid #aaa" | 0
| style="border: 1px solid #aaa" | 0
| style="border: 1px solid #aaa" | 
| style="border: 1px solid #aaa" | 0%
| style="border: 1px solid #aaa" | 8,499
| style="border: 1px solid #aaa" | 0.04%
| style="border: 1px solid #aaa" | -
|-
| data-sort-value="Independence" 
| style="border: 1px solid #aaa; text-align: left" scope="row" | 
| style="border: 1px solid #aaa; text-align: left" |
| style="border: 1px solid #aaa" | 9
| style="border: 1px solid #aaa" | 0
| style="border: 1px solid #aaa" | 0
| style="border: 1px solid #aaa" | 0
| style="border: 1px solid #aaa" | 
| style="border: 1px solid #aaa" | 0%
| style="border: 1px solid #aaa" | 7,470
| style="border: 1px solid #aaa" | 0.04%
| style="border: 1px solid #aaa" | -
|-
| data-sort-value="Roosevelt Progressive" 
| style="border: 1px solid #aaa; text-align: left" scope="row" | Roosevelt Progressive
| style="border: 1px solid #aaa; text-align: left" |
| style="border: 1px solid #aaa" | 1
| style="border: 1px solid #aaa" | 0
| style="border: 1px solid #aaa" | 0
| style="border: 1px solid #aaa" | 0
| style="border: 1px solid #aaa" | 
| style="border: 1px solid #aaa" | 0%
| style="border: 1px solid #aaa" | 5,891
| style="border: 1px solid #aaa" | 0.03%
| style="border: 1px solid #aaa" | -
|-
| data-sort-value="National Progressive" 
| style="border: 1px solid #aaa; text-align: left" scope="row" | National Progressive
| style="border: 1px solid #aaa; text-align: left" |
| style="border: 1px solid #aaa" | 2
| style="border: 1px solid #aaa" | 0
| style="border: 1px solid #aaa" | 0
| style="border: 1px solid #aaa" | 0
| style="border: 1px solid #aaa" | 
| style="border: 1px solid #aaa" | 0%
| style="border: 1px solid #aaa" | 5,714
| style="border: 1px solid #aaa" | 0.03%
| style="border: 1px solid #aaa" | -
|-
| data-sort-value="Taft for President" 
| style="border: 1px solid #aaa; text-align: left" scope="row" | Taft for President
| style="border: 1px solid #aaa; text-align: left" |
| style="border: 1px solid #aaa" | 1
| style="border: 1px solid #aaa" | 0
| style="border: 1px solid #aaa" | 0
| style="border: 1px solid #aaa" | 0
| style="border: 1px solid #aaa" | 
| style="border: 1px solid #aaa" | 0%
| style="border: 1px solid #aaa" | 2,269
| style="border: 1px solid #aaa" | 0.01%
| style="border: 1px solid #aaa" | -
|-
| data-sort-value="Industrialist" 
| style="border: 1px solid #aaa; text-align: left" scope="row" | Industrialist
| style="border: 1px solid #aaa; text-align: left" |
| style="border: 1px solid #aaa" | 1
| style="border: 1px solid #aaa" | 0
| style="border: 1px solid #aaa" | 0
| style="border: 1px solid #aaa" | 0
| style="border: 1px solid #aaa" | 
| style="border: 1px solid #aaa" | 0%
| style="border: 1px solid #aaa" | 1,075
| style="border: 1px solid #aaa" | 0.01%
| style="border: 1px solid #aaa" | -
|-
| data-sort-value="Jefferson" 
| style="border: 1px solid #aaa; text-align: left" scope="row" | Jefferson
| style="border: 1px solid #aaa; text-align: left" |
| style="border: 1px solid #aaa" | 1
| style="border: 1px solid #aaa" | 0
| style="border: 1px solid #aaa" | 0
| style="border: 1px solid #aaa" | 0
| style="border: 1px solid #aaa" | 
| style="border: 1px solid #aaa" | 0%
| style="border: 1px solid #aaa" | 73
| style="border: 1px solid #aaa" | 0.00%
| style="border: 1px solid #aaa" | -
|-
| data-sort-value="Workingmen's" 
| style="border: 1px solid #aaa; text-align: left" scope="row" | Workingmen's
| style="border: 1px solid #aaa; text-align: left" |
| style="border: 1px solid #aaa" | 1
| style="border: 1px solid #aaa" | 0
| style="border: 1px solid #aaa" | 0
| style="border: 1px solid #aaa" | 0
| style="border: 1px solid #aaa" | 
| style="border: 1px solid #aaa" | 0%
| style="border: 1px solid #aaa" | 15
| style="border: 1px solid #aaa" | 0.00%
| style="border: 1px solid #aaa" | -
|- class="unsortable" style="background-color:#F2F2F2
! style="border: 1px solid #aaa" colspan=3 | Total
! style="border: 1px solid #aaa" | 
! style="border: 1px solid #aaa" | 435
! style="border: 1px solid #aaa" |
! style="border: 1px solid #aaa" |
! style="border: 1px solid #aaa" |
! style="border: 1px solid #aaa" |
! style="border: 1px solid #aaa" | 18,967,165
! style="border: 1px solid #aaa" |
! style="border: 1px solid #aaa" |
|}

Early election dates 
Two states, with 6 seats between them, held elections early in 1912:

 September 3, 1912: Vermont
 September 9, 1912: Maine

This was the last year that Vermont held early elections.

Special elections 

There were four special elections in 1912 to the 57th United States Congress.

Special elections are sorted by date then district.

|-
! 
| Edmond H. Madison
|  | Republican
| 1906
|  | Incumbent died September 18, 1911.New member elected January 9, 1912.Democratic gain.
| nowrap | 
|-
! 
| Henry H. Bingham
|  | Republican
| 1878
|  | Incumbent died March 22, 1912.New member elected May 24, 1912.Republican hold.
| nowrap | 
|-
! 
| Elbert H. Hubbard
|  | Republican
| 1904
|  | Incumbent died June 4, 1912.New member elected November 5, 1912.Republican hold.
| nowrap | 
|-
! 
| George R. Malby
|  | Republican
| 1906
|  | Incumbent died July 5, 1912.New member elected November 5, 1912.Republican hold.
| nowrap | 

|}

Alabama 

|-
! 
| George W. Taylor
|  | Democratic
| 1896
| Incumbent re-elected.
| nowrap | 
|-
! 
| S. Hubert Dent Jr.
|  | Democratic
| 1908
| Incumbent re-elected.
| nowrap | 
|-
! 
| Henry De Lamar Clayton Jr.
|  | Democratic
| 1896
| Incumbent re-elected.
| nowrap | 
|-
! 
| Fred L. Blackmon
|  | Democratic
| 1910
| Incumbent re-elected.
| nowrap | 
|-
! 
| James Thomas Heflin
|  | Democratic
| 1904 (Special)
| Incumbent re-elected.
| nowrap | 
|-
! 
| Richmond P. Hobson
|  | Democratic
| 1906
| Incumbent re-elected.
| nowrap | 
|-
! 
| John L. Burnett
|  | Democratic
| 1898
| Incumbent re-elected.
| nowrap | 
|-
! 
| William N. Richardson
|  | Democratic
| 1900 (Special)
| Incumbent re-elected.
| nowrap | 
|-
! 
| Oscar Underwood
|  | Democratic
| 1894 (contested) 1896
| Incumbent re-elected.
| nowrap | 
|-
! 
| colspan=3 | None (District created)
| |New seat.New member elected.Democratic gain.
| nowrap | 

|}

Arizona 

|-
! 
| Carl Hayden
|  | Democratic
| 1911
| Incumbent re-elected.
| nowrap | 

|}

Arkansas 

|-
! 
| Robert B. Macon
|  | Democratic
| 1902
|  | New member elected.Democratic Hold
| nowrap | 
|-
! 
| William A. Oldfield
|  | Democratic
| 1908
| Incumbent re-elected.
| nowrap | 
|-
! 
| John C. Floyd
|  | Democratic
| 1904
| Incumbent re-elected.
| nowrap | 
|-
! 
| William B. Cravens
|  | Democratic
| 1906
|  | New member elected.Democratic Hold
| nowrap | 
|-
! 
| Henderson M. Jacoway
|  | Democratic
| 1910
| Incumbent re-elected.
| nowrap | 
|-
! 
| Joseph Taylor Robinson
|  | Democratic
| 1902
|  | Incumbent retired to run for Arkansas Governor.New member elected.Democratic Hold
| nowrap | 
|-
! 
| William S. Goodwin
|  | Democratic
| 1910
| Incumbent re-elected.
| nowrap | 
|}

California 

|-
! 
| William Kent
|  | Republican
| 1910
|  | Incumbent re-elected as an Independent.Independent gain.
| nowrap | 
|-
! 
| John E. Raker
|  | Democratic
| 1910
| Incumbent re-elected.
| nowrap | 
|-
! 
| colspan=3 | None (District created)
|  | New seat.New member elected.Republican gain.
| nowrap | 
|-
! 
| Julius Kahn
|  | Republican
| 1898
| Incumbent re-elected.
| nowrap | 
|-
! 
| colspan=3 | None (District created)
|  | New seat.New member elected.Republican gain.
| nowrap | 
|-
! 
| Joseph R. Knowland
|  | Republican
| 1904
| Incumbent re-elected.
| nowrap | 
|-
! 
| James C. Needham
|  | Republican
| 1898
|  | Incumbent lost re-election.New member elected.Democratic gain.
| nowrap | 
|-
! 
| Everis A. Hayes
|  | Republican
| 1904
| Incumbent re-elected.
| nowrap | 
|-
! 
| colspan=3 | None (District created)
|  | New seat.New member elected.Progressive gain.
| nowrap | 
|-
! 
| William Stephens
|  | Republican
| 1910
|  | Incumbent re-elected to different party.Progressive gain.
| nowrap | 
|-
! 
| Sylvester C. Smith
|  | Republican
| 1904
|  | Incumbent retired.New member elected.Democratic gain.Incumbent died before the Congress ended.
| nowrap | 

|}

Colorado 

|-
! 
| Atterson W. Rucker
|  | Democratic
| 1908
|  | Incumbent lost renomination.New member elected.Democratic hold.
| nowrap | 
|-
! 
| John Andrew Martin
|  | Democratic
| 1908
|  | Incumbent retired.New member elected.Democratic hold.
| nowrap | 
|-
! rowspan=2 |
| colspan=3 | New seat
|  | New member elected.Democratic gain.
| nowrap | 
|-
| colspan=3 | New seat
|  | New member elected.Democratic gain.
| See above
|}

Connecticut 

|-
! 
| | E. Stevens Henry
|  | Republican
| 1894
|  | Incumbent retired.New member elected.Democratic gain.
| nowrap | 
|-
! 
| Thomas L. Reilly
|  | Democratic
| 1910
|  | Incumbent retired to run for Connecticut 3.New member elected.Democratic Hold
| nowrap | 
|-
! 
| Edwin W. Higgins
|  | Republican
| 1904
|  | Incumbent retired.New member elected.Democratic gain.
| nowrap | 
|-
! 
| Ebenezer J. Hill
|  | Republican
| 1894
|  | Incumbent lost re-election.New member elected.Democratic gain.
| nowrap | 
|-
! 
| colspan=3 | None (District created)
||New seat.New member elected.Democratic gain.
| nowrap | 
|}

Delaware 

|-
! 
| William H. Heald
|  | Republican
| 1908
|  | Incumbent retired.New member elected.Democratic gain.
| nowrap | 

|}

Florida 

|-
! 
| Stephen M. Sparkman
|  | Democratic
| 1894
| Incumbent re-elected.
| nowrap | 
|-
! 
| Frank Clark
|  | Democratic
| 1904
| Incumbent re-elected.
| nowrap | 
|-
! 
| Dannite H. Mays
|  | Democratic
| 1908
|  | Incumbent lost renomination.New member elected.Democratic hold.
| nowrap | 
|-
! 
| colspan=3 | None (District created)
|  | New member elected.Democratic gain.
| nowrap | 
|}

Georgia 

|-
! 
| Charles G. Edwards
|  | Democratic
| 1906
| Incumbent re-elected.
| nowrap | 
|-
! 
| Seaborn A. Roddenbery
|  | Democratic
| 1910
| Incumbent re-elected.
| nowrap | 
|-
! 
| Dudley M. Hughes
|  | Democratic
| 1908
|  | Incumbent retired to run for Georgia 12.New member elected.Democratic Hold
| nowrap | 
|-
! 
| William C. Adamson
|  | Democratic
| 1896
| Incumbent re-elected.
| nowrap | 
|-
! 
| William S. Howard
|  | Democratic
| 1910
| Incumbent re-elected.
| nowrap | 
|-
! 
| Charles L. Bartlett
|  | Democratic
| 1894
| Incumbent re-elected.
| nowrap | 
|-
! 
| Gordon Lee
|  | Democratic
| 1904
| Incumbent re-elected.
| nowrap | 
|-
! 
| Samuel J. Tribble
| Independent Democrat
| 1910
| Incumbent re-elected.
| nowrap | 
|-
! 
| Thomas M. Bell
|  | Democratic
| 1904
| Incumbent re-elected.
| nowrap | 
|-
! 
| Thomas W. Hardwick
|  | Democratic
| 1902
| Incumbent re-elected.
| nowrap | 
|-
! 
| William G. Brantley
|  | Democratic
| 1896
|  | Incumbent retired.New member elected.Democratic Hold
| nowrap | 
|-
! 
| colspan=3 | None (District Created)
|  | New member elected.Democratic gain.
| nowrap | 
|}

Idaho 

|-
! rowspan=2 | 
| Burton L. French
|  | Republican
| nowrap | 1910
| Incumbent re-elected.
| nowrap rowspan=2 | 
|-
| colspan=3 | New seat
|  | New member elected.Republican gain.

|}

Illinois 

|-
! 
| Martin B. Madden
|  | Republican
| 1902
| Incumbent re-elected.
| nowrap | 
|-
! 
| James Robert Mann
|  | Republican
| 1896
| Incumbent re-elected.
| nowrap | 
|-
! 
| William W. Wilson
|  | Republican
| 1902
|  | Incumbent lost re-election.Democratic gain.
| nowrap | 
|-
! 
| James T. McDermott
|  | Democratic
| 1906
| Incumbent re-elected.
| nowrap | 
|-
! 
| Adolph J. Sabath
|  | Democratic
| 1906
| Incumbent re-elected.
| nowrap | 
|-
! 
| Edmund J. Stack
|  | Democratic
| 1906
|  | Incumbent lost renomination.New member elected.Democratic hold.
| nowrap | 
|-
! 
| Frank Buchanan
|  | Democratic
| 1906
| Incumbent re-elected.
| nowrap | 
|-
! 
| Thomas Gallagher
|  | Democratic
| 1908
| Incumbent re-elected.
| nowrap | 
|-
! 
| Lynden Evans
|  | Democratic
| 1910
|  | Incumbent lost re-election.New member elected.Republican gain.
| nowrap | 
|-
! 
| George Edmund Foss
|  | Republican
| 1894
|  | Incumbent lost re-election.New member elected.Progressive gain.
| nowrap | 
|-
! 
| Ira C. Copley
|  | Republican
| 1910
| Incumbent re-elected.
| nowrap | 
|-
! 
| Charles E. Fuller
|  | Republican
| 1902
|  | Incumbent lost re-election.New member elected.Progressive gain.
| nowrap | 
|-
! 
| John C. McKenzie
|  | Republican
| 1910
| Incumbent re-elected.
| nowrap | 
|-
! 
| James McKinney
|  | Republican
| 1905
|  | Incumbent retired.New member elected.Democratic gain.
| nowrap | 
|-
! 
| George W. Prince
|  | Republican
| 1895
|  | Incumbent lost re-election.New member elected.Democratic gain.
| nowrap | 
|-
! 
| Claude U. Stone
|  | Democratic
| 1910
| Incumbent re-elected.
| nowrap | 
|-
! 
| John A. Sterling
|  | Republican
| 1902
|  | Incumbent lost re-election.New member elected.Democratic gain.
| nowrap | 
|-
! 
| Joseph G. Cannon
|  | Republican
| 1872
|  | Incumbent lost re-election.New member elected.Democratic gain.
| nowrap | 
|-
! 
| William B. McKinley
|  | Republican
| 1904
|  | Incumbent lost re-election.New member elected.Democratic gain.
| nowrap | 
|-
! 
| Henry T. Rainey
|  | Democratic
| 1902
| Incumbent re-elected.
| nowrap | 
|-
! 
| James M. Graham
|  | Democratic
| 1908
| Incumbent re-elected.
| nowrap | 
|-
! 
| William A. Rodenberg
|  | Republican
| 1898
|  | Incumbent lost re-election.New member elected.Democratic gain.
| nowrap | 
|-
! 
| Martin D. Foster
|  | Democratic
| 1904
| Incumbent re-elected.
| nowrap | 
|-
! 
| H. Robert Fowler
|  | Democratic
| 1910
| Incumbent re-elected.
| nowrap | 
|-
! 
| Napoleon B. Thistlewood
|  | Republican
| 1908
|  | Incumbent lost re-election.New member elected.Democratic gain.
| nowrap | 
|-
! rowspan=2 | 
| colspan=3 | New seat
|  | New member elected.Democratic gain.
| nowrap | 
|-
| colspan=3 | New seat
|  | New member elected.Democratic gain.
| nowrap | 

|}

Indiana 

|-
! 
| John W. Boehne
|  | Democratic
| 1908
|  | Incumbent retired.New member elected.Democratic hold.
| nowrap | 
|-
! 
| William A. Cullop
|  | Democratic
| 1908
| Incumbent re-elected.
| nowrap | 
|-
! 
| William E. Cox
|  | Democratic
| 1908
| Incumbent re-elected.
| nowrap | 
|-
! 
| Lincoln Dixon
|  | Democratic
| 1904
| Incumbent re-elected.
| nowrap | 
|-
! 
| Ralph Wilbur Moss
|  | Democratic
| 1908
| Incumbent re-elected.
| nowrap | 
|-
! 
| Finly H. Gray
|  | Democratic
| 1910
| Incumbent re-elected.
| nowrap | 
|-
! 
| Charles A. Korbly
|  | Democratic
| 1908
| Incumbent re-elected.
| nowrap | 
|-
! 
| John A. M. Adair
|  | Democratic
| 1906
| Incumbent re-elected.
| nowrap | 
|-
! 
| Martin A. Morrison
|  | Democratic
| 1906
| Incumbent re-elected.
| nowrap | 
|-
! 
| Edgar D. Crumpacker
|  | Republican
| 1896
|  | Incumbent lost re-election.Democratic gain.
| nowrap | 
|-
! 
| George W. Rauch
|  | Democratic
| 1906
| Incumbent re-elected.
| nowrap | 
|-
! 
| Cyrus Cline
|  | Democratic
| 1906
| Incumbent re-elected.
| nowrap | 
|-
! 
| Henry A. Barnhart
|  | Democratic
| 1908
| Incumbent re-elected.
| nowrap | 
|}

Iowa 

|-
! 
| Charles A. Kennedy
|  | Republican
| 1906
| Incumbent re-elected.
| nowrap | 
|-
! 
| Irvin S. Pepper
|  | Democratic
| 1910
| Incumbent re-elected.
| nowrap | 
|-
! 
| Charles E. Pickett
|  | Republican
| 1908
|  | Incumbent lost re-election.New member elected.Democratic gain.
| nowrap | 
|-
! 
| Gilbert N. Haugen
|  | Republican
| 1898
| Incumbent re-elected.
| nowrap | 
|-
! 
| Gilbert N. Haugen
|  | Republican
| 1908
| Incumbent re-elected.
| nowrap | 
|-
! 
| Nathan E. Kendall
|  | Republican
| 1908
|  | Incumbent renominated but withdrew prior to election.New member elected.Democratic gain.
| nowrap | 
|-
! 
| Solomon F. Prouty
|  | Republican
| 1908
| Incumbent re-elected.
| nowrap | 
|-
! 
| Horace Mann Towner
|  | Republican
| 1910
| Incumbent re-elected.
| nowrap | 
|-
! 
| William R. Green
|  | Republican
| 1911
| Incumbent re-elected.
| nowrap | 
|-
! 
| Frank P. Woods
|  | Republican
| 1908
| Incumbent re-elected.
| nowrap | 
|-
! 
| Elbert Hamilton Hubbard
|  | Republican
| 1908
|  | Incumbent died June 4, 1912.New member elected. Republican hold.
| nowrap | 
|}

Kansas 

|-
! 
| Daniel R. Anthony Jr.
|  | Republican
| 1907 
| Incumbent re-elected.
| nowrap | 
|-
! 
| Joseph Taggart
|  | Democratic
| 1911 
| Incumbent re-elected.
| nowrap | 
|-
! 
| Philip P. Campbell
|  | Republican
| 1902
| Incumbent re-elected.
| nowrap | 
|-
! 
| Fred S. Jackson
|  | Republican
| 1910
|  | Incumbent lost re-election.New member elected.Democratic gain.
| nowrap | 
|-
! 
| Rollin R. Rees
|  | Republican
| 1910
|  | Incumbent lost re-election.New member elected.Democratic gain.
| nowrap | 
|-
! 
| Isaac D. Young
|  | Republican
| 1910
|  | Incumbent lost re-election.New member elected.Democratic gain.
| nowrap | 
|-
! 
| George A. Neeley
|  | Democratic
| 1912 
| Incumbent re-elected.
| nowrap | 
|-
! 
| Victor Murdock
|  | Republican
| 1902
| Incumbent re-elected.
| nowrap | 
|}

Kentucky 

|-
! 
| Alben W. Barkley
|  | Democratic
| 1912
|  | Incumbent retired to run for U.S. Senator.New member elected.Democratic Hold
| nowrap | 
|-
! 
| Augustus O. Stanley
|  | Democratic
| 1902
| Incumbent re-elected.
| nowrap | 
|-
! 
| Robert Y. Thomas Jr.
|  | Democratic
| 1908
| Incumbent re-elected.
| nowrap | 
|-
! 
| Ben Johnson
|  | Democratic
| 1906
| Incumbent re-elected.
| nowrap | 
|-
! 
| J. Swagar Sherley
|  | Democratic
| 1902
| Incumbent re-elected.
| nowrap | 
|-
! 
| Arthur B. Rouse
|  | Democratic
| 1910
| Incumbent re-elected.
| nowrap | 
|-
! 
| J. Campbell Cantrill
|  | Democratic
| 1908
| Incumbent re-elected.
| nowrap | 
|-
! 
| Harvey Helm
|  | Democratic
| 1906
| Incumbent re-elected.
| nowrap | 
|-
! 
| William J. Fields
|  | Democratic
| 1910
| Incumbent re-elected.
| nowrap | 
|-
! 
| John W. Langley
|  | Republican
| 1906
| Incumbent re-elected.
| nowrap | 
|-
! 
| Caleb Powers
|  | Republican
| 1910
| Incumbent re-elected.
| nowrap | 
|}

Louisiana 

|-
! 
| Albert Estopinal
|  | Democratic
| 1908
| Incumbent re-elected.
| nowrap | 
|-
! 
| Henry Garland Dupre
|  | Democratic
| 1910
| Incumbent re-elected.
| nowrap | 
|-
! 
| Robert F. Broussard
|  | Democratic
| 1896
| Incumbent re-elected.
| nowrap | 
|-
! 
| John T. Watkins
|  | Democratic
| 1904
| Incumbent re-elected.
| nowrap | 
|-
! 
| Joseph E. Ransdell
|  | Democratic
| 1900
|  | Incumbent retired to run for Senate.New member elected.Democratic Hold
| nowrap | 
|-
! 
| Lewis L. Morgan
|  | Democratic
| 1912
| Incumbent re-elected.
| nowrap | 
|-
! 
| Arsene P. Pujo
|  | Democratic
| 1902
|  | Incumbent retired.New member elected.Democratic Hold
| nowrap | 
|-
! 
| colspan=3 | None (District created)
||New seat.New member elected.Democratic gain.
| nowrap | 
|}

Maine 

|-
! 
| Asher C. Hinds
|  | Republican
| 1910
| Incumbent re-elected.
| nowrap | 
|-
! 
| Daniel J. McGillicuddy
|  | Democratic
| 1892
| Incumbent re-elected.
| nowrap | 
|-
! 
| Samuel W. Gould
|  | Democratic
| 1908
|  | Incumbent lost re-election.New member elected.Republican gain.
| nowrap | 
|-
! 
| Frank E. Guernsey
|  | Republican
| 1908
| Incumbent re-elected.
| nowrap | 
|}

Maryland 

|-
! 
| James Harry Covington
|  | Democratic
| 1908
| Incumbent re-elected.
| nowrap | 
|-
! 
| J. Frederick C. Talbott
|  | Democratic
| 1902
| Incumbent re-elected.
| nowrap | 
|-
! 
| George Konig
|  | Democratic
| 1910
| Incumbent re-elected.
| nowrap | 
|-
! 
| John Charles Linthicum
|  | Democratic
| 1910
| Incumbent re-elected.
| nowrap | 
|-
! 
| Thomas Parran
|  | Republican
| 1910
|  | Incumbent lost re-election. New member elected. Democratic gain.
| nowrap | 
|-
! 
| David John Lewis
| } | Democratic
| 1910
| Incumbent re-elected.
| nowrap | 
|}

Massachusetts 

|-
! 
| George P. Lawrence
|  | Republican
| 1897 (special)
|  | Incumbent retired.New member elected.Republican hold.
| nowrap | 
|-
! 
| Frederick H. Gillett
|  | Republican
| 1892
| Incumbent re-elected.
| nowrap | 
|-
! 
| William Wilder
|  | Republican
| 1910
| Incumbent re-elected.
| nowrap | 
|-
! 
| John A. Thayer
|  | Democratic
| 1910
|  | Incumbent lost re-election.New member elected.Republican gain.
| nowrap | 
|-
! 
| Butler Ames
|  | Republican
| 1902
|  | Incumbent retired.New member elected.Republican hold.
| nowrap | 
|-
! 
| Augustus Peabody Gardner
|  | Republican
| 1902 (special)
| Incumbent re-elected.
| nowrap | 
|-
! 
| colspan="3" | New district
|  | New seat.New member elected.Democratic gain.
| nowrap | 
|-
! 
| Samuel W. McCall
|  | Republican
| 1892
|  | Incumbent retired.New member elected.Democratic gain.
| nowrap | 
|-
! 
| Ernest W. Roberts
|  | Republican
| 1898
| Incumbent re-elected.
| nowrap | 
|-
! 
| William Francis Murray
|  | Democratic
| 1910
| Incumbent re-elected.
| nowrap | 
|-
! 
| Andrew James Peters
|  | Democratic
| 1906
| Incumbent re-elected.
| nowrap |  
|-
! 
| James Michael Curley
|  | Democratic
| 1910
| Incumbent re-elected.
| nowrap |
|-
! 
| John W. Weeks
|  | Republican
| 1904
| Incumbent re-elected.
| nowrap | 
|-
! 
| Robert O. Harris
|  | Republican
| 1910
|  | Incumbent lost re-election.New member elected.Democratic gain.
| nowrap | 
|-
! 
| William S. Greene
|  | Republican
| 1898 (special)
| Incumbent re-elected.
| nowrap | 
|-
! 
| colspan="3" | New district.
|  | New seat.New member elected.Democratic gain.
| nowrap | 
|}

Michigan 

|-
! 
| Frank E. Doremus
|  | Democratic
| 1910
| Incumbent re-elected.
| nowrap | 
|-
! 
| William Wedemeyer
|  | Republican
| 1910
|  | Incumbent lost re-election.New member elected.Democratic gain.
| nowrap | 
|-
! 
| John M. C. Smith
|  | Republican
| 1910
| Incumbent re-elected.
| nowrap | 
|-
! 
| Edward L. Hamilton
|  | Republican
| 1896
| Incumbent re-elected.
| nowrap | 
|-
! 
| Edwin F. Sweet
|  | Democratic
| 1910
|  | Incumbent lost re-election.New member elected.Republican gain.
| nowrap | 
|-
! 
| Samuel W. Smith
|  | Republican
| 1896
| Incumbent re-elected.
| nowrap | 
|-
! 
| Henry McMorran
|  | Republican
| 1902
|  | Incumbent retired.New member elected.Republican hold.
| nowrap | 
|-
! 
| Joseph W. Fordney
|  | Republican
| 1898
| Incumbent re-elected.
| nowrap | 
|-
! 
| James C. McLaughlin
|  | Republican
| 1906
| Incumbent re-elected.
| nowrap | 
|-
! 
| George A. Loud
|  | Republican
| 1902
|  | Incumbent lost re-election.New member elected.Progressive gain.
| nowrap | 
|-
! 
| Francis H. Dodds
|  | Republican
| 1908
|  | Incumbent lost renomination.New member elected.Republican hold.
| nowrap | 
|-
! 
| H. Olin Young
|  | Republican
| 1902
|  | Incumbent lost re-election.New member elected.Progressive gain.
| nowrap | 
|-
! 
| colspan="3" | New district.
|  | New seat.New member elected.Republican gain.
|  Patrick H. Kelley (Republican)
|}

Minnesota 

|-
! 
| Sydney Anderson
|  | Republican
| 1910
| Incumbent re-elected.
| nowrap | 
|-
! 
| Winfield Scott Hammond
|  | Democratic
| 1892
| Incumbent re-elected.
| nowrap | 
|-
! 
| Charles Russell Davis
|  | Republican
| 1902
| Incumbent re-elected.
| nowrap | 
|-
! 
| Frederick Clement Stevens
|  | Republican
| 1896
| Incumbent re-elected.
| nowrap | 
|-
! 
| Frank M. Nye
|  | Republican
| 1906
|  | Incumbent retired.New member elected. Republican hold.
| nowrap | 
|-
! 
| Charles Augustus Lindbergh, Sr.
|  | Republican
| 1906
| Incumbent re-elected.
| nowrap | 
|-
! 
| Andrew John Volstead
|  | Republican
| 1906
| Incumbent re-elected.
| nowrap | 
|-
! 
| Clarence Benjamin Miller
|  | Republican
| 1908
| Incumbent re-elected.
| nowrap | 
|-
! 
| Halvor Steenerson
|  | Republican
| 1902
| Incumbent re-elected.
| nowrap | 
|-
! 
| colspan="3" | New district.
|  | New seat.New member elected.Republican gain.
|  James Manahan (Republican)
|}

Mississippi 

|-
! 
| Ezekiel S. Candler Jr.
|  | Democratic
| 1900
| Incumbent re-elected.
| nowrap | 
|-
! 
| Hubert D. Stephens
|  | Democratic
| 1910
| Incumbent re-elected.
| nowrap | 
|-
! 
| Benjamin G. Humphreys II
|  | Democratic
| 1902
| Incumbent re-elected.
| nowrap | 
|-
! 
| Thomas U. Sisson
|  | Democratic
| 1908
| Incumbent re-elected.
| nowrap | 
|-
! 
| Samuel A. Witherspoon
|  | Democratic
| 1910
| Incumbent re-elected.
| nowrap | 
|-
! 
| Pat Harrison
|  | Democratic
| 1910
| Incumbent re-elected.
| nowrap | 
|-
! 
| William A. Dickson
|  | Democratic
| 1908
|  | Incumbent retired.New member elected.Democratic hold.
|  nowrap | 
|-
! 
| James Collier
|  | Democratic
| 1908
| Incumbent re-elected.
| nowrap | 

|}

Missouri 

|-
! 
| James T. Lloyd
|  | Democratic
| 1898
| Incumbent re-elected.
| nowrap | 
|-
! 
| William W. Rucker
|  | Democratic
| 1898
| Incumbent re-elected.
| nowrap | 
|-
! 
| Joshua W. Alexander
|  | Democratic
| 1906
| Incumbent re-elected.
| nowrap | 
|-
! 
| Charles F. Booher
|  | Democratic
| 1889
| Incumbent re-elected.
| nowrap | 
|-
! 
| William P. Borland
|  | Democratic
| 1908
| Incumbent re-elected.
| nowrap | 
|-
! 
| Clement C. Dickinson
|  | Democratic
| 1910
| Incumbent re-elected.
| nowrap | 
|-
! 
| Courtney W. Hamlin
|  | Democratic
| 1902
| Incumbent re-elected.
| nowrap | 
|-
! 
| Dorsey W. Shackleford
|  | Democratic
| 1899
| Incumbent re-elected.
| nowrap | 
|-
! 
| Champ Clark
|  | Democratic
| 1892
| Incumbent re-elected.
| nowrap | 
|-
! 
| Richard Bartholdt
|  | Republican
| 1892
| Incumbent re-elected.
| nowrap | 
|-
! 
| Patrick F. Gill
|  | Democratic
| 1908
|  | Incumbent lost renomination.New member elected.Democratic hold.
| nowrap | 
|-
! 
| Leonidas C. Dyer
|  | Democratic
| 1910
|  | Incumbent lost re-election.New member elected.Democratic gain.
| nowrap | 
|-
! 
| Walter L. Hensley
|  | Democratic
| 1910
| Incumbent re-elected.
| nowrap | 
|-
! 
| Joseph J. Russell
|  | Democratic
| 1904
| Incumbent re-elected.
| nowrap | 
|-
! 
| James A. Daugherty
|  | Democratic
| 1910
|  | Incumbent lost re-nomination.New member elected.Democratic hold.
| nowrap | 
|-
! 
| Thomas L. Rubey
|  | Democratic
| 1908
| Incumbent re-elected.
| nowrap | 
|}

Montana 

|-
! rowspan=2 | 
| Charles N. Pray
|  | Republican
| nowrap | 1906
|  | Incumbent lost re-election.New member elected.Democratic gain.
| nowrap rowspan=2 | 
|-
| colspan=3 | New seat
|  | New member elected.Democratic gain.

|}

Nebraska 

|-
! 
| John A. Maguire
|  | Democratic
| 1908
| Incumbent re-elected.
| nowrap | 

|-
! 
| Charles O. Lobeck
|  | Democratic
| 1910
| Incumbent re-elected.
| nowrap | 

|-
! 
| Dan V. Stephens
|  | Democratic
| 1911 (special)
| Incumbent re-elected.
| nowrap | 

|-
! 
| Charles H. Sloan
|  | Republican
| 1910
| Incumbent re-elected.
| nowrap | 

|-
! 
| George W. Norris
|  | Republican
| 1902
|  | Incumbent retired to run for U.S. senator.New member elected.Republican hold.
| nowrap | 

|-
! 
| Moses Kinkaid
|  | Republican
| 1902
| Incumbent re-elected.
| nowrap | 

|}

Nevada 

|-
! 
| Edwin E. Roberts
|  | Republican
| 1910
| Incumbent re-elected.
| nowrap | 
|}

New Hampshire 

|-
! 
| Cyrus A. Sulloway
|  | Republican
| 1894
|  | Incumbent lost re-election.New member elected.Democratic gain.
| nowrap | 
|-
! 
| Frank D. Currier
|  | Republican
| 1900
|  | Incumbent lost re-election.New member elected.Democratic gain.
| nowrap | 

|}

New Jersey 

|-
! 
| William J. Browning
|  | Republican
| 1911
| Incumbent re-elected.
| nowrap | 
|-
! 
| John J. Gardner
|  | Republican
| 1892
|  | Incumbent lost re-election.New member elected.Democratic gain.
| nowrap | 
|-
! 
| Thomas J. Scully
|  | Democratic
| 1910
| Incumbent re-elected.
| nowrap | 
|-
! 
| Ira W. Wood
|  | Republican
| 1904
|  | Incumbent retired.New member elected.Democratic gain.
| nowrap | 
|-
! 
| William E. Tuttle Jr.
|  | Democratic
| 1910
| Incumbent re-elected.
| nowrap | 
|-
! 
| colspan=3 | Vacant
|  | Incumbent William Hughes (Democratic) resigned after appointment as judge of Court of Common Pleas of Passaic County.New member elected.Democratic hold.
| nowrap | 
|-
! 
| Edward W. Townsend
|  | Democratic
| 1908
|  | Incumbent redistricted to NJ 10.New member elected.Democratic hold.
| nowrap | 
|-
! 
| Walter I. McCoy
|  | Democratic
| 1910
|  | Incumbent redistricted to NJ 9.New member elected.Democratic hold.
| nowrap | 
|-
! 
| Eugene F. Kinkead
|  | Democratic
| 1908
|  | Incumbent redistricted to NJ 8.New member elected.Democratic hold.
| nowrap | 
|-
! 
| James A. Hamill
|  | Democratic
| 1906
|  | Incumbent redistricted to NJ 11.New member elected.Democratic hold.
| nowrap | 
|-
! 
| colspan=3 | None (District created)
|  | New seat.New member elected.Democratic gain.
| nowrap | 
|-
! 
| James A. Hamill
| None (District created)
| 1906
|  | New seat.NJ 10 Incumbent re-elected.Democratic gain.
| nowrap | 
|}

New Mexico 

|-
! rowspan=2 | 
| Harvey B. Fergusson
|  | Democratic
| 1911
| Incumbent re-elected.
| nowrap rowspan=2 | 
|-
| George Curry
|  | Republican
| 1911
|  | Incumbent retired.Seat eliminated in reapportionment.Republican loss.

|}

New York 

|-
! 
| Martin W. Littleton
|  | Democratic
| 1910
|  | Incumbent retired.New member elected.Democratic hold.
| nowrap | 
|-
! 
| George H. Lindsay
|  | Democratic
| 1900
|  | Incumbent retired.New member elected.Democratic hold.
| nowrap | 
|-
! 
| James P. Maher
|  | Democratic
| 1908
|  | Incumbent ran in NY 5.New member elected.Democratic hold.
| nowrap | 
|-
! 
| Frank E. Wilson
|  | Democratic
| 1898
|  | Incumbent ran in NY 3.New member elected.Democratic hold.
| nowrap | 
|-
! 
| William Cox Redfield
|  | Democratic
| 1908
|  | Incumbent retired.New member elected.Democratic hold.
| nowrap | 
|-
! 
| William M. Calder
|  | Republican
| 1904
| Incumbent re-elected
| nowrap | 
|-
! 
| John J. Fitzgerald
|  | Democratic
| 1898
| Incumbent re-elected
| nowrap | 
|-
! 
| Daniel J. Riordan
|  | Democratic
| 1898
|  | Incumbent ran in NY 11.New member elected.Democratic hold.
| nowrap | 
|-
! 
| Henry M. Goldfogle
|  | Democratic
| 1900
|  | Incumbent ran in NY 12.New member elected.Democratic hold.
| nowrap | 
|-
! 
| William Sulzer
|  | Democratic
| 1894
|  | Incumbent retired to run for Governor of New York.New member elected.Democratic hold.
| nowrap | 
|-
! 
| Charles V. Fornes
|  | Democratic
| 1896
|  | Incumbent retired.New member elected.Democratic hold.
| nowrap | 
|-
! 
| Michael F. Conry
|  | Democratic
| 1896
|  | Incumbent ran in NY 15.New member elected.Democratic hold.
| nowrap | 
|-
! 
| Jefferson M. Levy
|  | Democratic
| 1898
|  | Incumbent ran in NY 14.New member elected.Democratic hold.
| nowrap | 
|-
! 
| John J. Kindred
|  | Democratic
| 1910
|  | Incumbent retired.New member elected.Democratic hold.
| nowrap | 
|-
! 
| Thomas G. Patten
|  | Democratic
| 1910
|  | Incumbent ran in NY 18.New member elected.Democratic hold.
| nowrap | 
|-
! 
| Francis Burton Harrison
|  | Democratic
| 1902
|  | Incumbent ran in NY 20.New member elected.Democratic hold.
| nowrap | 
|-
! 
| Henry George, Jr.
|  | Democratic
| 1910
|  | Incumbent ran in NY 21.New member elected.Democratic hold.
| nowrap | 
|-
! 
| Steven Beckwith Ayres
|  | Democratic
| 1910
|  | Incumbent lost re-election.New member elected.Democratic hold.
| nowrap | 
|-
! 
| John Emory Andrus
|  | Republican
| 1904
|  | Incumbent retired.New member elected.Progressive gain.
| nowrap | 
|-
! 
| Thomas W. Bradley
|  | Republican
| 1902
|  | Incumbent retired.New member elected.Democratic gain.
| nowrap | 
|-
! 
| Richard E. Connell
|  | Democratic
| 1896
|  | Incumbent won renomination, but died.New member elected.Democratic hold.
| nowrap | 
|-
! 
| William H. Draper
|  | Republican
| 1900
|  | Incumbent retired.New member elected.Democratic gain.
| nowrap | 
|-
! 
| Henry S. DeForest
|  | Republican
| 1910
|  | Incumbent lost renomination.New member elected.Democratic gain.
| nowrap | 
|-
! 
| George W. Fairchild
|  | Republican
| 1906
|  | Incumbent ran in NY 34.New member elected.Democratic gain.
| nowrap | 
|-
! 
| Theron Akin
|  | Progressive
| 1910
|  | Incumbent lost renomination.New member elected.Democratic gain.
| nowrap | 
|-
! 
| Edwin A. Merritt
|  | Republican
| 1910
|  | Incumbent ran in NY 31.New member elected.Republican hold.
| nowrap | 
|-
! 
| Charles A. Talcott
|  | Democratic
| 1910
|  | Incumbent ran in NY 33.New member elected.Democratic hold.
| nowrap | 
|-
! 
| Luther W. Mott
|  | Republican
| 1910
|  | Incumbent ran in NY 32.New member elected.Democratic Gain.
| nowrap | 
|-
! 
| Michael E. Driscoll
|  | Republican
| 1898
|  | Incumbent lost renomination.New member elected.Republican hold.
| nowrap | 
|-
! 
| John W. Dwight
|  | Republican
| 1902
|  | Incumbent retired.New member elected.Republican hold.
| nowrap | 
|-
! 
| Sereno E. Payne
|  | Republican
| 1882
|  | Incumbent ran in NY 36.New member elected.Republican hold.
| nowrap | 
|-
! 
| Henry G. Danforth
|  | Republican
| 1910
|  | Incumbent ran in NY 39.New member elected.Republican hold.
| nowrap | 
|-
! 
| Edwin S. Underhill
|  | Democratic
| 1910
|  | Incumbent ran in NY 37.New member elected.Democratic hold.
| nowrap | 
|-
! 
| James S. Simmons
|  | Republican
| 1908
|  | Incumbent ran in NY 40.New member elected.Republican hold.
| nowrap | 
|-
! 
| Daniel A. Driscoll
|  | Democratic
| 1908
|  | Incumbent ran in NY 42.New member elected.Democratic hold.
| nowrap | 
|-
! 
| Charles Bennett Smith
|  | Democratic
| 1910
|  | Incumbent ran in NY 41.New member elected.Republican gain.
| nowrap | 
|-
! 
| Edward B. Vreeland
|  | Republican
| 1910
|  | Incumbent ran in NY 41.New member elected.Democratic gain.
| nowrap | 
|-
! 
| colspan=3 | New seat
|  | .New member elected.Republican gain.
| nowrap | 
|-
! 
| colspan=3 | New seat
|  | .New member elected.Republican gain.
| nowrap | 
|-
! 
| colspan=3 | New seat
|  | .New member elected.Democratic gain.
| nowrap | 
|-
! 
| colspan=3 | New seat
|  | .New member elected.Democratic gain.
| nowrap | 
|-
! 
| colspan=3 | New seat
|  | .New member elected.Democratic gain.
| nowrap | 
|-
! 
| colspan=3 | New seat
|  | .New member elected.Republican gain.
| nowrap | 
|}

North Carolina 

|-
! 
| John H. Small
|  | Democratic
| 1898
| Incumbent re-elected.
| nowrap | 
|-
! 
| Claude Kitchin
|  | Democratic
| 1898
| Incumbent re-elected.
| nowrap | 
|-
! 
| John M. Faison
|  | Democratic
| 1910
| Incumbent re-elected.
| nowrap | 
|-
! 
| Edward W. Pou
|  | Democratic
| 1896
| Incumbent re-elected.
| nowrap | 
|-
! 
| Charles M. Stedman
|  | Democratic
| 1910
| Incumbent re-elected.
| nowrap | 
|-
! 
| Hannibal L. Godwin
|  | Democratic
| 1906
| Incumbent re-elected.
| nowrap | 
|-
! 
| Robert N. Page
|  | Democratic
| 1902
| Incumbent re-elected.
| nowrap | 
|-
! 
| Robert L. Doughton
|  | Democratic
| 1910
| Incumbent re-elected.
| nowrap | 
|-
! 
| E. Yates Webb
|  | Democratic
| 1902
| Incumbent re-elected.
| nowrap | 
|-
! 
| James M. Gudger Jr.
|  | Democratic
| 1902
| Incumbent re-elected.
| nowrap | 
|}

North Dakota 

|-
! 
| Henry T. Helgesen
|  | Republican
| 1910
| Incumbent re-elected.
| nowrap | 
|-
! 
| colspan=3 rowspan=2 | None (new district)
|  | New member elected.Republican gain.
| nowrap | 
|-
! 
|  | New member elected.Republican gain.
| nowrap | 

|}

Ohio 

|-
! 
| Nicholas Longworth
|  | Republican
| 1902
|  | Incumbent lost reelection.New member elected.Democratic gain.
| nowrap | 
|-
! 
| Alfred G. Allen
|  | Democratic
| 1910
| Incumbent reelected.
| nowrap | 
|-
! 
| James M. Cox
|  | Democratic
| 1908
|  | Incumbent retired to run for Ohio Governor.New member elected.Democratic hold.
| nowrap | 
|-
! 
| J. Henry Goeke
|  | Democratic
| 1910
| Incumbent reelected.
| nowrap | 
|-
! 
| Timothy T. Ansberry
|  | Democratic
| 1904
| Incumbent reelected.
| nowrap | 
|-
! 
| Matthew R. Denver
|  | Democratic
| 1906
|  | Incumbent retired.New member elected.Republican gain.
| nowrap | 
|-
! 
| James D. Post
|  | Democratic
| 1910
| Incumbent reelected.
| nowrap | 
|-
! 
| Frank B. Willis
|  | Republican
| 1910
| Incumbent reelected.
| nowrap | 
|-
! 
| Isaac R. Sherwood
|  | Democratic
| 1872
| Incumbent reelected.
| nowrap | 
|-
! 
| Robert M. Switzer
|  | Republican
| 1910
| Incumbent reelected.
| nowrap | 
|-
! 
| Horatio C. Claypool
|  | Democratic
| 1910
| Incumbent reelected.
| nowrap | 
|-
! 
| Edward L. Taylor
|  | Republican
| 1904
|  | Incumbent lost re-election.New member elected.Democratic gain.
| nowrap | 
|-
! 
| Carl C. Anderson
|  | Democratic
| 1908
|  | Incumbent died.New member elected.Democratic hold.
| nowrap | 
|-
! 
| William G. Sharp
|  | Democratic
| 1900
| Incumbent re-elected.
| nowrap | 
|-
! 
| George White
|  | Democratic
| 1906
| Incumbent re-elected.
| nowrap | 
|-
! 
| William B. Francis
|  | Democratic
| 1910
| Incumbent re-elected.
| nowrap | 
|-
! 
| William A. Ashbrook
|  | Democratic
| 1906
| Incumbent re-elected.
| nowrap | 
|-
! 
| John J. Whitacre
|  | Democratic
| 1908
| Incumbent re-elected.
| nowrap | 
|-
! 
| Ellsworth R. Bathrick
|  | Democratic
| 1910
| Incumbent re-elected.
| nowrap | 
|-
! 
| Paul Howland
|  | Republican
| 1906
|  | Incumbent lost re-election.New member elected.Democratic gain.
| nowrap | 
|-
! 
| Robert J. Bulkley
|  | Democratic
| 1910
| Incumbent re-elected.
| nowrap | 
|}

Oklahoma 

|-
! 
| Bird S. McGuire
| 
| 1907
| Incumbent re-elected.
| nowrap | 

|-
! 
| Dick T. Morgan
| 
| 1908
| Incumbent re-elected.
| nowrap | 

|-
! 
| James S. Davenport
| 
| 1910
| Incumbent re-elected.
| nowrap | 

|-
! 
| Charles D. Carter
| 
| 1907
| Incumbent re-elected.
| nowrap | 

|-
! 
| Scott Ferris
| 
| 1907
| Incumbent re-elected.
| nowrap | 

|-
! rowspan=3 | 
| colspan=3 | None 
|  | New seat.New member elected.Democratic gain.
| rowspan=3 nowrap | 
|-
| colspan=3 | None 
|  | New seat.New member elected.Democratic gain.
|-
| colspan=3 | None 
|  | New seat.New member elected.Democratic gain.

|}

Oregon 

|-
! 
| Willis C. Hawley
|  | Republican
| 1906
| Incumbent re-elected.
| nowrap | 
|-
! 
| colspan=3 | NoneIncumbent redistricted
|  | Incumbent redistricted to the .New member elected.Republican hold.
| nowrap | 
|-
! 
| Walter Lafferty
|  | Republican
| 1910
|  | Incumbent redistricted from the .Incumbent re-elected.Republican gain.
| nowrap | 
|}

Pennsylvania 

|-
! 
| William Scott Vare
|  | Republican
| 1912
| Incumbent re-elected.
| nowrap | 
|-
! 
| William S. Reyburn
|  | Republican
| 1911
|  | Incumbent withdrew from primary.New member elected.Republican hold.
| nowrap | 
|-
! 
| J. Hampton Moore
|  | Republican
| 1906
| Incumbent re-elected.
| nowrap | 
|-
! 
| Reuben O. Moon
|  | Republican
| 1903
|  | Incumbent lost renomination.New member elected.Republican hold.
| nowrap | 
|-
! 
| Michael Donohoe
|  | Democratic
| 1908
| Incumbent re-elected
| nowrap | 
|-
! 
| George D. McCreary
|  | Republican
| 1902
|  | Incumbent retired.New member elected.Democratic gain.
| nowrap | 
|-
! 
| Thomas S. Butler
|  | Republican
| 1896
| Incumbent re-elected
| nowrap | 
|-
! 
| Robert E. Difenderfer
|  | Democratic
| 1910
| Incumbent re-elected
| nowrap | 
|-
! 
| William Walton Griest
|  | Republican
| 1908
| Incumbent re-elected
| nowrap | 
|-
! 
| John R. Farr
|  | Republican
| 1908
| Incumbent re-elected
| nowrap | 
|-
! 
| Charles C. Bowman
|  | Republican
| 1910
|  | Incumbent lost re-election.New member elected.Democratic gain.
| nowrap | 
|-
! 
| Robert Emmett Lee
|  | Democratic
| 1908
| Incumbent re-elected
| nowrap | 
|-
! 
| John H. Rothermel
|  | Democratic
| 1906
| Incumbent re-elected
| nowrap | 
|-
! 
| William D.B. Ainey
|  | Republican
| 1911
| Incumbent re-elected
| nowrap | 
|-
! 
| William B. Wilson
|  | Democratic
| 1906
|  | Incumbent lost re-election.New member elected.Republican gain.
| nowrap | 
|-
! 
| John G. McHenry
|  | Democratic
| 1906
|  | Incumbent died.New member elected.Democratic hold.
| nowrap | 
|-
! 
| Benjamin Kurtz Focht
|  | Republican
| 1900
|  | Incumbent lost re-election.New member elected.Democratic gain.
| nowrap | 
|-
! 
| Marlin Edgar Olmsted
|  | Republican
| 1896
|  | Incumbent retired.New member elected.Republican hold.
| nowrap | 
|-
! 
| Jesse L. Hartman
|  | Republican
| 1910
|  | Incumbent lost re-election.New member elected.Democratic gain.
| nowrap | 
|-
! 
| Daniel F. Lafean
|  | Republican
| 1902
|  | Incumbent lost re-election.New member elected.Democratic gain.
| nowrap | 
|-
! 
| Charles E. Patton
|  | Republican
| 1910
| Incumbent re-elected
| nowrap | 
|-
! 
| Curtis H. Gregg
|  | Democratic
| 1900
|  | Incumbent lost re-election.New member elected.Republican gain.
| nowrap | 
|-
! 
| Thomas S. Crago
|  | Republican
| 1910
|  | Incumbent lost re-election.New member elected.Democratic gain.
| nowrap | 
|-
! 
| Charles Matthews
|  | Republican
| 1910
|  | Incumbent lost re-election.New member elected.Progressive gain.
| nowrap | 
|-
! 
| Arthur L. Bates
|  | Republican
| 1900
|  | Incumbent retired.New member elected.Republican hold.
| nowrap | 
|-
! 
| A. Mitchell Palmer
|  | Democratic
| 1908
| Incumbent re-elected
| nowrap | 
|-
! 
| Jonathan N. Langham
|  | Republican
| 1908
| Incumbent re-elected
| nowrap | 
|-
! 
| Peter M. Speer
|  | Republican
| 1910
|  | Incumbent lost re-election.New member elected.Progressive gain.
| nowrap | 
|-
! 
| Stephen G. Porter
|  | Republican
| 1910
| Incumbent re-elected
| nowrap | 
|-
! 
| John Dalzell
|  | Republican
| 1886
|  | Incumbent lost renomination.New member elected.Republican hold.
| nowrap | 
|-
! 
| James F. Burke
|  | Republican
| 1902
| Incumbent re-elected
| nowrap | 
|-
! 
| Andrew J. Barchfeld
|  | Republican
| 1902
| Incumbent re-elected
| nowrap | 
|-
| rowspan=4 | 
| colspan=3 | None (District created)
| |New seat.New member elected.Republican gain.
| nowrap |
  Fred E. Lewis (Republican)
|-
| colspan=3 | None (District created)
| |New seat.New member elected.Republican gain.
| nowrap |
  John M. Morin (Republican)
|-
| colspan=3 | None (District created)
| |New seat.New member elected.Republican gain.
| nowrap |
  Anderson H. Walters (Republican)
|-
| colspan=3 | None (District created)
| |New seat.New member elected.Republican gain.
| nowrap | 
  Arthur R. Rupley (Republican)
|}

Rhode Island 

|-
! 
| George F. O'Shaunessy
|  | Democratic
| 1910
| Incumbent re-elected.
| nowrap | 
|-
! 
| | George H. Utter
|  | Republican
| 1910
|  | Incumbent died campaigning for second term.New member elected.Democratic gain.
| nowrap | 
|-
! 
| colspan=3 | None (District created)
|  | New member elected.Republican gain.
| nowrap | 
|}

South Carolina 

|-
! 
| George Swinton Legaré
|  | Democratic
| 1902
| Incumbent re-elected.
| nowrap | 
|-
! 
| James F. Byrnes
|  | Democratic
| 1910
| Incumbent re-elected.
| nowrap | 
|-
! 
| Wyatt Aiken
|  | Democratic
| 1902
| Incumbent re-elected.
| nowrap | 
|-
! 
| Joseph T. Johnson
|  | Democratic
| 1900
| Incumbent re-elected.
| nowrap | 
|-
! 
| David E. Finley
|  | Democratic
| 1898
| Incumbent re-elected.
| nowrap | 
|-
! 
| J. Edwin Ellerbe
|  | Democratic
| 1904
|  | Incumbent lost renomination.New member elected.Democratic hold.
| nowrap | 
|-
! 
| J. William Stokes
|  | Democratic
| 1894
|  | Incumbent died July 6, 1901.New member elected.Democratic hold.Successor also elected the same day to finish the current term.
| nowrap | 

|}

South Dakota 

|-
! 
| colspan=3 | None (new district)
|  | New member elected.Republican gain.
| nowrap | 
|-
! 
| Charles H. Burke
|  | Republican
| 1908
| Incumbent re-elected.
| nowrap | 
|-
! 
| Eben Martin
|  | Republican
| 1908
| Incumbent re-elected.
| nowrap | 

|}

Tennessee 

|-
! 
| Sam R. Sells
|  | Republican
| 1910
| Incumbent re-elected.
| nowrap | 
|-
! 
| Richard W. Austin
|  | Republican
| 1908
| Incumbent re-elected.
| nowrap | 
|-
! 
| John A. Moon
|  | Democratic
| 1896
| Incumbent re-elected.
| nowrap | 
|-
! 
| Cordell Hull
|  | Democratic
| 1906
| Incumbent re-elected.
|  nowrap | 
|-
! 
| William C. Houston
|  | Democratic
| 1904
| Incumbent re-elected.
| nowrap | 
|-
! 
| Jo Byrns
|  | Democratic
| 1908
| Incumbent re-elected.
| nowrap | 
|-
! 
| Lemuel P. Padgett
|  | Democratic
| 1900
| Incumbent re-elected.
| nowrap | 
|-
! 
| Thetus W. Sims
|  | Democratic
| 1896
| Incumbent re-elected.
| nowrap | 
|-
! 
| Finis J. Garrett
|  | Democratic
| 1904
| Incumbent re-elected.
| nowrap | 
|-
! 
| Kenneth McKellar
|  | Democratic
| 1911 (special)
| Incumbent re-elected.
| 

|}

Texas 

|-
! 
| Morris Sheppard
|  | Democratic
| 1902
|  | Incumbent retired to run for TX Senate.New member elected.Democratic hold.
| nowrap | 
|-
! 
| Martin Dies
|  | Democratic
| 1908
| Incumbent re-elected
| nowrap | 
|-
! 
| James Young
|  | Democratic
| 1910
| Incumbent re-elected
| nowrap | 
|-
! 
| Choice B. Randell
|  | Democratic
| 1900
|  | Incumbent retired to run for TX Senate.New member elected.Democratic hold.
| nowrap | 
|-
! 
| James Andrew Beall
|  | Democratic
| 1902
| Incumbent re-elected
| nowrap | 
|-
! 
| Rufus Hardy
|  | Democratic
| 1906
| Incumbent re-elected
| nowrap | 
|-
! 
| Alexander W. Gregg
|  | Democratic
| 1902
| Incumbent re-elected
| nowrap | 
|-
! 
| John M. Moore
|  | Democratic
| 1905
|  | Incumbent retired?.New member elected.Democratic hold.
| nowrap | 
|-
! 
| George F. Burgess
|  | Democratic
| 1900
| Incumbent re-elected
| nowrap | 
|-
! 
| Albert S. Burleson
|  | Democratic
| 1898
| Incumbent re-elected
| nowrap | 
|-
! 
| Robert L. Henry
|  | Democratic
| 1896
| Incumbent re-elected
| nowrap | 
|-
! 
| Oscar Callaway
|  | Democratic
| 1910
| Incumbent re-elected
| nowrap | 
|-
! 
| John H. Stephens
|  | Democratic
| 1896
| Incumbent re-elected
| nowrap | 
|-
! 
| James L. Slayden
|  | Democratic
| 1896
| Incumbent re-elected
| nowrap | 
|-
! 
| John Nance Garner
|  | Democratic
| 1902
| Incumbent re-elected
| nowrap | 
|-
! 
| William R. Smith
|  | Democratic
| 1902
| Incumbent re-elected
| nowrap | 
|-
! rowspan=2 | 
| colspan="3" | New district.
|  | New seat.New member elected.Democratic gain.
|  Daniel E. Garrett (Democratic)
|-
| colspan="3" | New district.
|  | New seat.New member elected.Democratic gain.
|  Hatton W. Sumners (Democratic)
|}

Utah 

The Utah election consisted of an all-party general ticket election to the two at-large seats. Howell was elected to the first at-large seat, while Johnson was elected to the second at-large seat, but they were nevertheless placed in districts.

|-
! 
| Joseph Howell
|  | Republican
| nowrap | 1902
| Incumbent re-elected.
| rowspan=2 | 
|-
! 
| colspan=3 | New seat
|  | New member elected.Republican gain.

|}

Vermont 

|-
! 
| Frank Lester Greene
|  | Republican
| 1912
| Incumbent re-elected.
| nowrap | 
|-
! 
| Frank Plumley
|  | Republican
| 1908
| Incumbent re-elected.
| nowrap | 
|}

Virginia 

|-
! 
| William Atkinson Jones
|  | Democratic
| 1890
| Incumbent re-elected.
| nowrap | 
|-
! 
| Edward Everett Holland
|  | Democratic
| 1910
| Incumbent re-elected.
| nowrap | 
|-
! 
| John Lamb
|  | Democratic
| 1896
| | Incumbent retired.New member elected.Democratic hold.
| nowrap | 
|-
! 
| Robert Turnbull
|  | Democratic
| 1910
| | Incumbent lost re-election.New member elected.Democratic hold.
| nowrap | 
|-
! 
| Edward W. Saunders
|  | Democratic
| 1906 
| Incumbent re-elected.
| nowrap | 
|-
! 
| Carter Glass
|  | Democratic
| 1902 
| Incumbent re-elected.
| nowrap | 
|-
! 
| James Hay
|  | Democratic
| 1896
| Incumbent re-elected.
| nowrap | 
|-
! 
| Charles Creighton Carlin
|  | Democratic
| 1907 
| Incumbent re-elected.
| nowrap | 
|-
! 
| C. Bascom Slemp
|  | Republican
| 1907 
| Incumbent re-elected.
| nowrap | 
|-
! 
| Henry D. Flood
|  | Democratic
| 1900
| Incumbent re-elected.
| nowrap | 
|}

Washington 

|-
! 
| William E. Humphrey
|  | Republican
| 1902
| Incumbent re-elected.
| nowrap | 
|-
! 
| Stanton Warburton
|  | Republican
| 1910
|  | Incumbent lost re-election.New member elected.Republican hold.
| nowrap | 
|-
! 
| William La Follette
|  | Republican
| 1910
| Incumbent re-elected.
| nowrap | 
|-
! rowspan=2 | 
| colspan=3 | New seat
|  | New seat.New member elected.Progressive gain. 
| rowspan=2 nowrap | 
|-
| colspan=3 | New seat
|  | New seat.New member elected.Progressive gain.

|}

West Virginia 

|-
! 
| John W. Davis
|  | Democratic
| 1910
| Incumbent re-elected.
| nowrap | 
|-
! 
| William Gay Brown Jr.
|  | Democratic
| 1910
| Incumbent re-elected.
| nowrap | 
|-
! 
| Adam Brown Littlepage
|  | Democratic
| 1910
|  | Incumbent lost re-election.New member elected.Republican gain.
| nowrap | 
|-
! 
| John M. Hamilton
|  | Democratic
| 1910
|  | Incumbent lost re-election.New member elected.Republican gain.
| nowrap | 
|-
! 
| James A. Hughes
|  | Republican
| 1900
| Incumbent re-elected.
| nowrap | 
|-
! 
| colspan=3 | New seat
|  | New member elected.Republican gain.
| nowrap | 

|}

Wisconsin 

|-
! 
| Henry Allen Cooper
|  | Republican
| 1890
| Incumbent re-elected.
| nowrap | 
|-
! 
| John M. Nelson
|  | Republican
| 1906
|  | Incumbent ran in WI 3.New member elected.Democratic gain.
| nowrap | 
|-
! 
| Arthur W. Kopp
|  | Republican
| 1908
|  | Incumbent retired.New member elected.Republican hold.
| nowrap | 
|-
! 
| William J. Cary
|  | Republican
| 1906
|  | Incumbent re-elected as a Democrat.New member elected.Democratic gain.
| nowrap | 
|-
! 
| Victor L. Berger
|  | Socialist
| 1910
|  | Incumbent lost re-election.New member elected.Republican gain.
| nowrap | 
|-
! 
| Michael E. Burke
|  | Democratic
| 1910
|  | Incumbent ran in WI 2.New member elected.Democratic hold.
| nowrap | 
|-
! 
| John J. Esch
|  | Republican
| 1898
| Incumbent re-elected.
| nowrap | 
|-
! 
| James H. Davidson
|  | Republican
| 1896
|  | Incumbent lost re-election in WI 6.New member elected.Republican hold.
| nowrap | 
|-
! 
| Thomas F. Konop
|  | Democratic
| 1910
| Incumbent re-elected.
| nowrap | 
|-
! 
| Elmer A. Morse
|  | Republican
| 1906
|  | Incumbent lost re-election in WI 9.New member elected.Republican hold.
| nowrap | 
|-
! 
| Irvine L. Lenroot
|  | Republican
| 1908
| Incumbent re-elected.
| nowrap | 
|}

Wyoming 

|-
! 
| Frank Wheeler Mondell
|  | Republican
| 1898
| Incumbent re-elected.
| nowrap | 

|}

Non-voting delegates

Alaska Territory 

Alaska Territory elected its non-voting delegate on August 13, 1912.

|-
! 
| James Wickersham
|  | Republican
| 1908
|  | Incumbent re-elected to a different party.Progressive gain.
| nowrap | 

|}

Hawaii Territory 

|-
! 
| Jonah Kūhiō Kalanianaʻole
|  | Republican
| 1902
| Incumbent re-elected.
| nowrap | 

|}

See also 
 1912 United States elections
 1912 United States presidential election
 1912–13 United States Senate elections
 62nd United States Congress
 63rd United States Congress

Notes

References

Bibliography

External links 
 Office of the Historian (Office of Art & Archives, Office of the Clerk, U.S. House of Representatives)